Peter Devine (born May 17, 1976) is an American fencer. He competed in the individual and team foil events at the 1996 Summer Olympics.

References

External links
 

1976 births
Living people
American male foil fencers
Olympic fencers of the United States
Fencers at the 1996 Summer Olympics
Sportspeople from New York City